The 1988 CCHA Men's Ice Hockey Tournament was the 17th CCHA Men's Ice Hockey Tournament. It was played between March 4 and March 12, 1988. First round games were played at campus sites, while 'final four' games were played at Joe Louis Arena in Detroit, Michigan. By winning the tournament, Bowling Green received the Central Collegiate Hockey Association's automatic bid to the 1988 NCAA Division I Men's Ice Hockey Tournament.

Format
The tournament featured three rounds of play. The team that finished below eighth place in the standings was not eligible for postseason play. In the quarterfinals, the first and eighth seeds, the second and seventh seeds, the third seed and sixth seeds and the fourth seed and fifth seeds played a best-of-three series, with the winners advancing to the semifinals. In the semifinals, the remaining highest and lowest seeds and second highest and second lowest seeds play a single-game, with the winners advancing to the finals. The tournament champion receives an automatic bid to the 1988 NCAA Division I Men's Ice Hockey Tournament.

Conference standings
Note: GP = Games played; W = Wins; L = Losses; T = Ties; PTS = Points; GF = Goals For; GA = Goals Against

Bracket

Note: * denotes overtime period(s)

First round

(1) Lake Superior State vs. (8) Ohio State

(2) Bowling Green vs. (7) Ferris State

(3) Michigan State vs. (6) Illinois–Chicago

(4) Western Michigan vs. (5) Michigan

Semifinals

(1) Lake Superior State vs. (4) Western Michigan

(2) Bowling Green vs. (3) Michigan State

Consolation Game

(3) Michigan State vs. (4) Western Michigan

Championship

(1) Lake Superior State vs. (2) Bowling Green

Tournament awards

All-Tournament Team
F Don Barber (Bowling Green)
F Brett Barnett (Lake Superior State)
F Bobby Reynolds (Michigan State)
D Scott Paluch (Bowling Green)
D Karl Johnston (Lake Superior State)
G Paul Connell* (Bowling Green)
* Most Valuable Player(s)

References

External links
CCHA Champions
1987–88 CCHA Standings
1987–88 NCAA Standings

CCHA Men's Ice Hockey Tournament
Ccha tournament